After the Room Clears is an album by Permanent Me, released in 2007.

Track listing

Personnel 

Mike Fleischmann – drums
Joseph Guccione – guitar, vocals
Terese Joseph – A&R
Brian James – guitar, vocals
Sarah Lewitinn – A&R
Louis Marino – artwork, layout design
Meaghan Montagano – portrait photography
Justin Morrell – bass
Rey Roldan – publicity
Matt Squire – producer, engineer, mixing, audio production, audio engineer
Andy West – art direction, design

References

2007 albums
Permanent Me albums